Senan may refer

 Saint Senan of Inis Cathaig
 Saint Senan of Laraghabrine
Senan Browne
 Senan, Yonne, a commune in France
 Senan, Iran, a village in Iran
 Senan, Tarragona, a municipality in Spain